Changing Places is an album by Norwegian jazz pianist and composer Tord Gustavsen recorded in 2001-2002 and released on ECM.

Reception
The Allmusic review by Glenn Astarita awarded the album 2½ stars stating:

Track listing 
All compositions by Tord Gustavsen.

«Deep as Love» (5:54)
«Graceful Touch» (3:50)
«IGN» (4:33)
«Melted Matter» (5:25)
«At a Glance» (4:18)
«Song of Yearning» (8:16)
«Turning Point» (5:47)
«Interlude» (1:01)
«Where Breathing Starts» (8:49)
«Going Places» (5:33)
«Your Eyes» (5:07)
«Graceful Touch, Variation» (4:33)
«Song Of Yearning (Solo)» (1:59)

Personnel 
Tord Gustavsen - piano
Harald Johnsen - bass
Jarle Vespestad - drums

Additional personnel
Engineered by Jan Erik Kongshaug
Cover photography & artwork design by Sascha Kleis
Liner photos by Erik J. Laeskogen
Produced by Manfred Eicher

References 

ECM Records albums
Tord Gustavsen albums
2003 albums
Albums produced by Manfred Eicher